Siah Darreh 1 Farhadi (also Romanized as Sīāh Darreh 1 Farhādī; also known as Sīāh Darreh-ye Farhādī and Sīāh Darreh-ye Yek) is a village in Teshkan Rural District, Chegeni District, Dowreh County, Lorestan Province, Iran. At the 2006 census, its population was 129, in 29 families.

References 

Towns and villages in Dowreh County